The Different Company is a luxury perfume house  established in 2000 by perfumer Jean-Claude Ellena and Thierry de Baschmakoff in Paris, France. Its products are available worldwide in boutiques and concept stores.   Since 2005, all fragrances have been created by Céline Ellena, daughter of Jean-Claude Ellena. The line includes refillable bottles, travel sets, and leather cases.

Fragrances by Jean-Claude Ellena
 Bois d'Iris (2000)
 Osmanthus (2001)
 Rose Poivrée (2001) (5 stars by Chandler Burr, New York Times Magazine)
 Bergamote (2004)

Fragrances by Celine Ellena
 Jasmin de Nuit (2005)
 Sel de Vetiver (2006) (5 stars by Chandler Burr, New York Times Magazine, Best Unisex Scent Award by BeautynewsNYC.com)
 Parfum d'Ailleurs et Fleurs (2006)
 Parfum de Sens et Bois (2006)
 Parfum de Charmes et Feuilles (2006)

References

External links
Official website

Perfume houses
Companies established in 2000
Companies based in Paris